The 1974 WFL Pro Draft was the first professional draft of the World Football League (WFL). It supplemented its collegiate draft and included players from the NFL and CFL. It consisted of 480 selections in 40 rounds. Although it was expected that most of the NFL players drafted would have no intention of signing with the new league, the WFL still wanted to have the prominent NFL players future rights assigned, preventing WFL teams from competing in the signing for the same players.

Player selections

1974 WFL second day Pro Draft
On March 19, 1974, the WFL had a second Pro Draft to select the rights to players cut by National Football League teams. Each WFL team selected 2 NFL franchises to secure the rights to players not previously selected in the first day 40 rounds Pro Draft. The New York Giants and Chicago Bears were not drafted.

 Toronto Northmen: Green Bay Packers, Detroit Lions.
 Birmingham Americans: Miami Dolphins, Atlanta Falcons.
 Detroit Wheels: Minnesota Vikings, Buffalo Bills.
 Washington Ambassadors: New England Patriots, Baltimore Colts.
 Philadelphia Bell: Los Angeles Rams, Washington Redskins.
 Portland Storm: Dallas Cowboys, St. Louis Cardinals.
 Jacksonville Sharks: Houston Oilers, Philadelphia Eagles.
 Southern California Sun: San Francisco 49ers, Denver Broncos.
 Chicago Winds: Cincinnati Bengals, Cleveland Browns.
 Houston Texans: Kansas City Chiefs, New Orleans Saints.
 The Hawaiians: San Diego Chargers, Oakland Raiders.
 New York Stars: New York Jets, Pittsburgh Steelers.

1975 WFL Pro Draft
In 1975, because of the uncertainties surrounding the league, only a Pro Draft of entire NFL and CFL teams was done at its league meetings in Birmingham, Alabama. The professional football teams chosen were the following:

 Birmingham Vulcans: Atlanta Falcons, Kansas City Chiefs and Winnipeg Blue Bombers.
 Charlotte Hornets: Baltimore Colts, Detroit Lions and Buffalo Bills.
 Chicago Winds: Pittsburgh Steelers, New York Jets and Edmonton Eskimos.
 The Hawaiians: San Francisco 49ers, Denver Broncos and Philadelphia Eagles.
 Jacksonville Express: Miami Dolphins, Cleveland Browns and Green Bay Packers.
 Memphis Southmen: Toronto Argonauts, St. Louis Cardinals and New England Patriots.
 Philadelphia Bell: Montreal Alouettes, New York Giants and Washington Redskins.
 Portland Thunder: Oakland Raiders, Minnesota Vikings, Ottawa Rough Riders and Saskatchewan Roughriders.
 San Antonio Wings: Dallas Cowboys, Houston Oilers, Calgary Stampeders and Hamilton Tiger-Cats.
 Shreveport Steamer: New Orleans Saints, Chicago Bears and Cincinnati Bengals.
 Southern California Sun: Los Angeles Rams, BC Lions and San Diego Chargers.

References

External links
 1974 WFL Pro Draft Birmingham Americans
 1974 WFL Pro Draft Chicago Fire
 1974 WFL Pro Draft Detroit Wheels
 1974 WFL Pro Draft Jacksonville Sharks

World Football League
World Football League